Hannibal J. Blair (September 19, 1855 – June 10, 1942) was an American politician in the state of Washington. He lived in Bickleton and served in the Washington House of Representatives from 1889 to 1891.

References

Members of the Washington House of Representatives
1855 births
1942 deaths
People from Polk County, Missouri
People from Klickitat County, Washington